Naked Soldier (絕色武器) is a 2012 Hong Kong action film directed by Marco Mak and starring Jennifer Tse. It is the third installment of the "Naked" series Naked Killer (1992) and Naked Weapon (2002).

Plot
The story of Phoenix who was kidnapped, when she was a child, by Madame Rose after killing her family except for Phoenix's father, Interpol agent CK Lung, who is still struggling to find his daughter. Phoenix is now an assassin under Madam Rose's orders, her target was her own father.

Cast
Jennifer Tse as Phoenix
Sammo Hung as CK Lung
Ellen Chan as Madame Rose
Philip Ng as Black Dragon
Ankie Beilke as Selina
Andy On as Sam Wong
Jia-Qi Kang as Wai-Chu Lung/Skinny
Lena Lin as Ivy
Jiang Luxia as Thai Assassin
Ian Powers as Honey/Mafia Chief
Timmy Hung as Pete
Anthony Wong as Power

References

External links
 
 

Girls with guns films
Films shot in Hong Kong
2010s Cantonese-language films
Hong Kong action films
2012 films
2012 action films
2010s Hong Kong films